Protein arginine N-methyltransferase 6 is an enzyme that in humans is encoded by the PRMT6 gene.

Protein arginine N-methyltransferases, such as PRMT6, catalyze the sequential transfer of a methyl group from S-adenosyl-L-methionine to the side chain nitrogens of arginine residues within proteins to form methylated arginine derivatives and S-adenosyl-L-homocysteine.[supplied by OMIM]

References

Further reading